The Scarecrow is the third full-length album by Tobias Sammet's German rock opera project Avantasia, released on 25 January 2008 through Nuclear Blast Records. It is the first part of "The Wicked Trilogy" and it is followed by The Wicked Symphony and Angel of Babylon. Sammet explained in a 2016 interview that he managed to have Alice Cooper after drummer Eric Singer asked him. Cooper requested to have a listen to the song first and then accepted to be part of it.

Plot
The Scarecrow is a concept album about the tragic story of a lonesome creature, emotionally isolated from his environment and suffering from a distorted sensory perception. His feelings for the love of his life unrequited, he sets off on a journey exploring his left-hand path, striving for inner peace, ploughing his way to approval and eventually facing temptation at the inner depths of the human soul. The story continues on the albums The Wicked Symphony and Angel of Babylon.

Track listing

Personnel
 Tobias Sammet – vocals, bass guitar, additional keyboards
 Sascha Paeth – guitars 
 Miro – keyboards, orchestration
 Eric Singer – drums

Guest vocalists
 Jørn Lande (ex-Ark, ex-Masterplan, Jorn) (tracks 2, 6, 8)
 Michael Kiske (ex-Helloween, Place Vendome, Unisonic) (track 2, 3, 5)
 Bob Catley (Magnum) (tracks 3, 9)
 Amanda Somerville (Aina) (track 5)
 Alice Cooper (track 7)
 Roy Khan (ex-Kamelot, Conception) (track 1)
 Oliver Hartmann (ex-At Vance) (track 10)

Guest musicians
 Henjo Richter – lead guitar (tracks 2, 3, 6, 7, 8)
 Kai Hansen – lead guitar (track 3)
 Rudolf Schenker – lead guitar (track 10)

Production
Produced by Sascha Paeth & Tobias Sammet
Recorded & Engineered by Chuck Garric, Sascha Paeth, Olaf Reitmeier & Mark Stuart
Mixed & Mastered by Sascha Paeth

Promo singles
 "Lost in Space" (2007)
 "Carry Me Over" (2007)

Videos
The video for "Lost in Space" was released in 2007 with the release of the EPs of the same name. In December 2007, the video for "Carry Me Over" was released on Myspace.
The Scarecrow's EPK (electronic press-kit) is available , courtesy of Tobias Sammet.

Charts

References

Avantasia albums
2008 albums
Rock operas
Concept albums
Nuclear Blast albums